The Story of My Typewriter is a 2002 book, by Paul Auster, mostly with pictures by the painter Sam Messer. It is about the author's old Olympia (de) typewriter. Auster bought the typewriter in 1974 from an old college friend who had owned it since 1962. Allegedly, everything Auster has written since has been typed on it.

Reception
Publishers Weekly described the book as "undeniably odd but captivating", praising both Auster's writing and Messer's artwork.

References

External links
Amazon.com
The Story of My Typewriter Overview

2002 American novels
Books by Paul Auster